Arnar Freyr Arnarsson (born 14 March 1996) is an Icelandic handball player for MT Melsungen and the Icelandic national team.

He participated at the 2017 and 2019 World Men's Handball Championships.

References

External links

1996 births
Living people
Arnar Freyr Arnarsson
Arnar Freyr Arnarsson
IFK Kristianstad players
Expatriate handball players
Arnar Freyr Arnarsson
Arnar Freyr Arnarsson